Kevin Krawietz and Andreas Mies were the defending champions but chose not to defend their title.

Philipp Oswald and Filip Polášek won the title by walkover after Nikola Čačić and Adam Pavlásek withdrew before the final.

Seeds

Draw

References

External links
 Main draw

Garden Open - Doubles
2019 Doubles
Garden